Nawab Sir  Muhammad Farid Khan Tanoli,  was the last ruling Nawab of the princely state of Amb, from 1936 till 1969. In 1947 he acceded his state to the Dominion of Pakistan.

A small state in a subsidiary alliance with British India, in 1958 Amb was reported to have an area of 590 square miles and a population of 48,656.

After 1947
After the independence of Pakistan in 1947, Amb became fully independent, and remained so for the rest of 1947, but on 31 December the Nawab acceded his state to Pakistan.

Nawab Farid khan Tanoli's contributions to the Pakistan movement were acknowledged by the Quaid e Azam.

References

1969 deaths
Hindkowan people
Nawabs of Amb
Princely rulers of Pakistan
Nawabs of Pakistan
1904 births